Primera B Metropolitana is one of two professional leagues that form the third level of the Argentine football league system. The division is made up of 17 clubs mainly from the city of Buenos Aires and its metropolitan area, Greater Buenos Aires.

Originally created as the second division, it became the third level after a restructuring of the system in 1985 that ended with the creation of Primera B Nacional, set as the second division since then.

The other league at level three is the Torneo Federal A, where teams from regional leagues take part.

Format
Primera B Metropolitana is currently organized so, during the course of a season, each club plays the others twice (a double round robin system), once at their home stadium and once at that of their opponents.

The team that gets the most points at the end of the season is recognized as the Primera B champion and is automatically promoted to Primera B Nacional. The teams that hold the second to fifth positions have the chance to enter the Torneo Reducido (small tournament) whose winner will be promoted.

The teams with the 2 lowest aggregate points total in Primera B Metropolitana are relegated to Primera C Metropolitana.

History
Established in 1899, the Primera B Metropolitana (originally named "Segunda División") was the first second division championship in Argentine football. Some of the teams participating were youth or reserve teams of Primera División clubs. Since 1906, a promotion and relegation system was established. Porteño would be the first club to achieve promotion under those rules.

In 1911, the Association created the "División Intermedia" as a second level of Argentine football pyramid, therefore the Segunda División became the third division of the system. Three years later, San Lorenzo de Almagro promoted to Primera División after beating Honor y Patria. Tournaments organised by dissident Asociación Amateurs (AAm) were named "Extra". When both associations, AAmF and AAF merged in 1926, from the 1927 season, the "Primera División Sección B" (predecessor of Primera B) is created and the Segunda División was set as the fourth level (level of youth team), and Intermedia the third.

In 1933, the Primera División Sección B and División Intermedia are eliminated and, its participants, become part of the Second Division and Third Division, which are again second and third level.

In 1949, the Primera División B was recreated and was contested by teams from the Segunda Division, which returned to the third level in 1950.

In 1986 the Argentine Association created the Primera B Nacional with the purpose of allowing clubs throughout Argentina to play official competitions. Primera B Nacional became the second division of Argentine football while Primera B was set as the third division, being also renamed "Primera B Metropolitana" due to it was contested by teams from the Buenos Aires metropolitan area (including Greater Buenos Aires).

Primera B Metropolitana has received several names since its inception in 1899 as the second division of Argentine football. The following charts describe the changes made to the division since its creation:

Division levels 
Since its inception in 1899 as "Segunda División", the Primera B Metropolitana has changed levels (between 2 and 3) and names several times. The table below shows them in details:

Current teams (2022 season)

List of champions
The tournament has received different names since its first edition in 1899, such as "Segunda División" (1899–1926), "Primera División B" (or simply "Primera B", since 1927).

After the restructuring of the Argentine football league system in 1985, the tournament became the third division, changing its name to "Primera B Metropolitana" to set a difference with Primera B Nacional.

Titles by club
This list include all the titles won with both, senior and reserve teams.

See also
 División Intermedia (2nd Division, 1911–26)
 Argentine football league system

Notes

References

External links
 
 Promiedos 

 
1899 establishments in Argentina
3
1
Sports leagues established in 1899
Argentina
Professional sports leagues in Argentina